David Hubbick (born 16 March 1960) is an English former professional footballer who played in the Football League for Wimbledon and Colchester United.

Career
Born in South Shields, Hubbick started his career at Ipswich Town. He began playing in the reserves in the 1976–77 season, making his reserve debut on 21 April 1977 as a substitute in a 3–1 defeat at Bristol City reserve. He signed a contract at the club in January 1978 and although he became a regular in the reserves, he never made a first team appearance. He signed for Wimbledon for £5,000 in September 1980, where he played 26 games for the club, before dropping into non-League with Gravesend & Northfleet in 1982.

After a spell with Dagenham, he returned to professional football with Colchester United in 1983. However, he made only 15 appearances for the club, and signed for Sudbury Town in 1985. Whilst at Sudbury he played at Wembley Stadium in the 1989 FA Vase final, scoring Sudbury's goal in a 1–1 draw, and was named man of the match. He later played for Cornard United and Woodbridge Town, who he managed between 1997 and 2003. He went on to manage Stowmarket Town, before resigning in January 2008.

Honours

Club
Sudbury Town
 FA Vase Runner-up (1): 1988–89

References

1960 births
Footballers from South Shields
English footballers
Ipswich Town F.C. players
Wimbledon F.C. players
Ebbsfleet United F.C. players
Dagenham F.C. players
Colchester United F.C. players
Sudbury Town F.C. players
Cornard United F.C. players
Woodbridge Town F.C. players
English football managers
Woodbridge Town F.C. managers
Stowmarket Town F.C. managers
Living people
Association football forwards